The 2005 U.S. Figure Skating Championships took place on January 9–16, 2005 at the Rose Garden in Portland, Oregon. Medals were awarded in four colors: gold (first), silver (second), bronze (third), and pewter (fourth) in four disciplines – men's singles, ladies' singles, pair skating, and ice dancing – across three levels: senior, junior, and novice.

The event was used to determine the U.S. teams for the 2005 World Championships, 2005 Four Continents Championships, and 2005 World Junior Championships.

Senior results

Men

Ladies

Pairs

Ice dancing

Junior results

Men

Ladies

Pairs

Ice dancing

Novice results

Men

Ladies

Pairs

Ice dancing

International team selections

World Championships

Four Continents Championships

World Junior Championships

Triglav Trophy

Gardena Spring Trophy

External links
 2005 United States Figure Skating Championships

U.S. Figure Skating Championships
United States Figure Skating Championships, 2005
F
U.S. Figure Skating
2005 in Portland, Oregon
January 2005 sports events in the United States